Ishly (Bashkir and , İşle) is a rural locality (a selo) and the administrative center of Ishlinsky Selsoviet, Aurgazinsky District, Bashkortostan, Russia. The population was 884 as of 2010. There are 14 streets.

Geography 
Ishly is located 21 km north of Tolbazy (the district's administrative centre) by road. Yakty-Yul is the nearest rural locality.

References 

Rural localities in Aurgazinsky District